Johann Konrad Eberlein(*1948 in Nürnberg) is an Austrian art historian.

From 1998 to 2012, he was a professor of art history at the University of Graz, Graz, Austria.

Works 
 Apparitio regis – revelatio veritatis. Studien zur Darstellung des Vorhangs in der bildenden Kunst von der Spätantike bis zum Ende des Mittelalters, Reichert, Wiesbaden 1982,  (Dissertation).
 Miniatur und Arbeit: Das Medium Buchmalerei,  1995, 
 Grundlagen der Mittelalterlichen Kunst. Eine Quellenkunde, 1996, 
 Albrecht Dürer, 2003 
 Harald de Bary: Leben und Werk, 2006, .
 "Angelus Novus": Paul Klees Bild und Walter Benjamins Deutung, 2006, 
 with Paul von Naredi-Rainer, Götz Pochat (eds.): Hauptwerke der Kunstgeschichtsschreibung. Kröner, Stuttgart 2010,

References 

1948 births
Living people
Austrian art historians
Academic staff of the University of Graz